Picador is an imprint of Pan Macmillan in the United Kingdom and Australia and of Macmillan Publishing in the United States. Both companies are owned by Georg von Holtzbrinck Publishing Group.

Picador was launched in the UK in 1972 by renowned publisher Sonny Mehta as a literary imprint of Pan Books with the aim of publishing outstanding international writing in paperback editions only. In 1990, Picador started publishing its own hardcovers. Picador in the UK continues to publish writers from all over the world, bringing international authors to an English-language readership and providing a platform for voices that are often not heard. The Picador list in the UK includes literary fiction; new, relevant and challenging fiction; narrative non-fiction; authoritative, cultural non-fiction; and the best contemporary poetry including former Poet Laureate Dame Carol Ann Duffy and Kae Tempest, 2013 winner of the Ted Hughes Award for their work Brand New Ancients. Picador is the home to prize-winning, internationally renowned writers, such as Scottish-American writer Douglas Stuart., winner of the Booker Prize in 2020 with his novel Shuggie Bain. Picador has also managed to bridge the gap between literary quality and commercial success with such genre-defining bestsellers as Jessie Burton's The Miniaturist and Adam Kay's This is Going to Hurt .

In the summer of 2018, the US branch of Picador announced that starting in April 2019 it would no longer publish original titles and would focus exclusively on reprinting as trade paperbacks literary works originated by editors elsewhere at Macmillan.

Picador authors across the UK and the USA have included Jonathan Franzen, Michael Chabon, Marilynne Robinson, Angela Carter, Thomas Pynchon, Raj Patel, Jon Ronson, Alan Hollinghurst, Graham Swift, John Banville, Patrick McCabe, Tim Winton, Mick Jackson, Colm Toibin, Trezza Azzopardi, Edward St Aubyn, Emma Donoghue, Jim Crace, Sunjeev Sahota, Hanya Yanagihara, Pankaj Mishra, Bret Easton Ellis and Sir Salman Rushdie Cormac McCarthy and Don Delillo.

See also
Picador Travel Classics

References

External links
 Official UK site
 Official USA site
 Official Australian site
 Picador India at Pan Macmillan India

 
Literary publishing companies
Book publishing companies of the United Kingdom
Book publishing companies of the United States
Publishing companies established in 1972
Holtzbrinck Publishing Group